Poland competed at the 1992 Winter Olympics in Albertville, France.

Competitors
The following is the list of number of competitors in the Games.

Alpine skiing

Men

Women

Biathlon

Men

Women

Cross-country skiing

Men

Women

Figure skating

Ice hockey

Group A
Twelve participating teams were placed in two groups. After playing a round-robin, the top four teams in each group advanced to the medal round while the last two teams competed in the consolation round for the 9th to 12th places.

Consolation round 9th-12th places

11th-place match

Contestants
Gabriel Samolej
Marek Batkiewicz
Mariusz Kieca
Kazimierz Jurek
Henryk Gruth
Rafal Sroka
Robert Szopinski
Dariusz Garbocz
Marek Cholewa
Jerzy Sobera
Andrzej Kadziolka
Krzystof Kuzniecow
Andrzej Swistak
Mariusz Puzio
Janusz Rajnos
Mirosław Tomasik
Waldemar Klisiak
Dariusz Platek
Janusz Adamiec
Krzystof Bujar
Mariusz Czerkawski
Wojciech Tkacz
Slawomir Wieloch
Head coach: Leszek Lejczyk

Luge

Nordic combined 

Men's individual

Events:
 normal hill ski jumping 
 15 km cross-country skiing

Ski jumping

Speed skating

Men

Women

References

Official Olympic Reports
 Olympic Winter Games 1992, full results by sports-reference.com

Nations at the 1992 Winter Olympics
1992
1992 in Polish sport